The 1995 Tour de France was the 82nd edition of Tour de France, one of cycling's Grand Tours. The Tour began in Saint-Brieuc with a prologue individual time trial on 1 July and Stage 11 occurred on 13 July with a hilly stage from Le Bourg-d'Oisans. The race finished on the Champs-Élysées in Paris on 23 July.

Stage 11
13 July 1995 — Le Bourg-d'Oisans to Saint-Étienne,

Stage 12
14 July 1995 — Saint-Étienne to Mende,

Stage 13
15 July 1995 — Mende to Revel,

Stage 14
16 July 1995 — Saint-Orens-de-Gameville to Guzet-Neige,

Stage 15
18 July 1995 — Saint-Girons to Cauterets, 

On the descent of the Col de Portet d'Aspet, Fabio Casartelli crashed into concrete blocks at the roadside, suffering a head injury which caused a loss of consciousness. Whilst being airlifted to hospital, he stopped breathing and was declared dead after undergoing numerous resuscitation attempts.

Stage 16
19 July 1995 — Tarbes to Pau, 

The stage was neutralised in memory of Fabio Casartelli. The route was ridden by the peloton, with Casartelli's Motorola teammates leading the way into Pau.

Stage 17
20 July 1995 — Pau to Bordeaux,

Stage 18
21 July 1995 — Montpon-Ménestérol to Limoges,

Stage 19
22 July 1995 — Lac de Vassivière,  (individual time trial)

Stage 20
23 July 1995 — Sainte-Geneviève-des-Bois to Paris Champs-Élysées,

References

1995 Tour de France
Tour de France stages